Nocardioides conyzicola is a Gram-positive, non-spore-forming, rod-shaped and non-motile bacterium from the genus Nocardioides.

References

External links
Type strain of Nocardioides conyzicola at BacDive -  the Bacterial Diversity Metadatabase

conyzicola
Bacteria described in 2013